Ryan Wilson is an American retired professional wrestler who formerly worked for World Wrestling Entertainment in the Ohio Valley Wrestling developmental promotion as Jacob Duncan where he was a former OVW Heavyweight Champion. He is best known for his appearances with Total Nonstop Action Wrestling, where he was known by his ring name Trytan.

Professional wrestling career

Early career (2001–2003) 
Wilson debuted in 2001, wrestling on the independent circuit.

Total Nonstop Action Wrestling (2003–2004, 2005) 
Wilson joined Total Nonstop Action Wrestling in September 2003 as one-half of a heel tag team, Redshirt Security, with Kevin Northcutt. Northcutt and Wilson were corrupt, physically imposing security guards (who wore red t-shirts) loyal to Don Callis and Jeff Jarrett, and regularly butt heads with the diminutive face "Blackshirt Security" (Chris Vaughn and Rick Santel). After Redshirt Security was expanded to three members with the addition of Legend in November 2003, the trio began feuding with the rebels who opposed the administration of Jarrett and Callis, namely Erik Watts, The Sandman, and Raven. This led to a six-man Clockwork Orange House of Fun match on November 19, in which Wilson suffered a broken arm. In 2004, he was fired for steroid abuse and was replaced by Legend.

Wilson returned to TNA one year later as Titus, the bodyguard of Jonny Fairplay. The gimmick was never televised, although Wilson made several dark match appearances, including a victory over Dallas on November 19. Fairplay was not employed by TNA on a regular basis, and the Titus character was eventually discarded.

In early 2005, video packages were aired hyping the debut of Wilson's latest gimmick, Trytan. The Trytan gimmick had aspects similar to The Terminator, including wearing black leather attire, sunglasses and even utilizing the character's classic mannerisms. Even his finisher, a fireman's carry facebuster was dubbed the T-3, the shortened name of Terminator 3: Rise of the Machines, and a take-off of Brock Lesnar's F-5. Wilson began stalking Monty Brown, and would disrupt his matches, extending a hand towards Brown from the entranceway. On March 13, Brown and Trytan faced off at Destination X. Brown eventually gained the upper hand over Trytan, but as he prepared to hit his signature Pounce finisher, the arena lights went out. When the lighting was restored, a masked man was in the ring in place of Wilson. Brown Pounced and pinned the masked man and was awarded the victory, although he had been unable to gain a victory over Wilson. The masked man was later identified as Mideon, but was never properly included in the storyline.

Wilson's push was virtually halted following his match at Destination X. He wrestled sporadically for TNA until May 2005, when he was placed in a tag team with Simon Diamond. Diamond and Trytan appeared at Slammiversary on June 19, defeating Apolo and Sonny Siaki in a tag team match. Wilson left TNA the following month when his contract expired and was not renewed.

World Wrestling Entertainment/Ohio Valley Wrestling (2005–2007, 2008) 
On November 14, 2005, Wilson signed a contract with World Wrestling Entertainment. He was assigned to the WWE developmental territory Ohio Valley Wrestling. He originally went by the name Tytus, making his debut at the January 18, 2006 OVW TV show by coming out alongside Da Beast. At the July 25 SmackDown!/ECW tapings, he defeated Funaki in a dark match. He then began wrestling in OVW under the ring name Jacob Duncan, a gimmick which saw him dress as a woodsman wearing a mask similar in design to the one Mick Foley wore as Mankind. He also spoke to his "momma" about getting his revenge on those who made fun of him growing up, indicating a sign of storyline psychosis.

After a match, Jacob was confronted in the ring by The Boogeyman and began a short feud with him. On August 23, Boogeyman unmasked Duncan to reveal his identity. At OVW's 400th anniversary show, Duncan defeated The Boogeyman in a tables match to end their feud. On October 25, 2006, Duncan won the OVW Heavyweight Championship from Chet the Jett in an impromptu title match. On December 15, Duncan dropped the title to Chet. In early 2007, Duncan began feuding with Dan Rodman over the interest of Beth Phoenix, resulting in a "love triangle". After the feud ended, Phoenix continued to manage Duncan in OVW before she made her last appearance in OVW on August 15, where she lost to Katie Lea in a number one contenders match for the OVW Women's Championship and then joined the main World Wrestling Entertainment roster full-time. On November 8, 2007, Wilson was released from his WWE developmental contract. On November 1, 2008, Wilson, reusing his Jacob Duncan gimmick, returned to OVW for one night only to cause a surprise attack on Anthony Bravado.

Championships and accomplishments
International Wrestling Association
IWA World Heavyweight Championship (1 time)
Ohio Valley Wrestling
OVW Heavyweight Championship (1 time)
New Wrestling Association
NWA World Championship (1 time)

References

External links 
 

American male professional wrestlers
Living people
Year of birth missing (living people)
21st-century professional wrestlers
OVW Heavyweight Champions